Wales is a mountainous country with a wet climate and hence home to many hundreds of waterfalls.  Some are popular visitor attractions, many are celebrated in legend whilst others are relatively unknown.

Naming of falls
As might be expected in this bilingual country, many waterfalls are known by both English and Welsh names. The terms  'rhaeadr', 'sgwd', 'pistyll' and 'ffrwd' all feature in the Welsh names of waterfalls. 'Sgwd' (plural 'sgydau') is restricted to the southern part of mid Wales, notably Brecknockshire whilst 'pistyll' is common in the northern parts of mid Wales.

Alphabetical table of named waterfalls

A, B, C

D, E, F

G, H, I, J, K, L

M, N, O

P, Q

R

S

T, U, V, W, X, Y, Z

See also
 Waterfall Country

References
Ordnance Survey 1:25,000 scale Explorer map series, sheets 151-266

 
Wales
Waterfalls